This is a list of films released by the British company Two Cities Films. From 1944 it became part of the Rank Organisation, but continued to maintain a separate brand.

See also
 List of Stoll Pictures films
 List of Gainsborough Pictures films
 List of British and Dominions films
 List of British Lion films
 List of Ealing Studios films
 List of British National films
 List of General Film Distributors films
 List of Paramount British films

References

Bibliography
 Macnab, Geoffrey. J. Arthur Rank and the British Film Industry. Routledge, 1994.

Lists of British films
Two Citie